The Kerryman is a weekly local newspaper published in County Kerry in Ireland by Independent News & Media who are a subsidiary of Mediahuis. The newspaper was founded in 1904 by Maurice Griffin and cousins Thomas and Daniel Nolan. Independent News & Media, then known as Independent Newspapers Limited acquired The Kerryman in 1972.

It has three different editions – North Kerry, South Kerry and Tralee. All three editions are tabloid format newspaper. The move of the Tralee edition to a tabloid format in 2006 meant that The Kerryman became Ireland's first dual format newspaper. The last broadsheet edition hit shops in 2009.

The main office is located on Denny Street in Tralee having moved from its previous base of over thirty years in the Clash Industrial Estate in 2007.

According to the Audit Bureau of Circulations, it had an average weekly circulation of 19,886 during the first six months of 2011, a fall of 3.5% year on year and 21% since 2008. These are the last circulation figures available as Independent News and Media, owner of the paper, refused to allow publication of audited figures for the second half of 2011 results as they "did not resonate with local advertisers." INM deregistered its twelve regional titles from auditing in February 2012 and in future will provide "bespoke local surveys" of sales.

Its current editor is Kevin Hughes. Paul Brennan is the newspaper's sports editor.

References

External links
 The Kerryman – Official website

1904 establishments in Ireland
Independent News & Media
Mass media in County Kerry
Newspapers published in the Republic of Ireland
Publications established in 1904
Tralee
Weekly newspapers published in Ireland